The snow-capped manakin (Lepidothrix nattereri) is a species of bird in the family Pipridae.
It is found in the Amazon Basin of Brazil and far northeastern Bolivia.
Its natural habitat is subtropical or tropical moist lowland forest. This is one of the parent species that hybridized to produce the golden-crowned manakin. A hybrid zone between this species and the opal-crowned manakin exists where the two species ranges come into geographic contact in the Cachimbo Range.

References

snow-capped manakin
Birds of the Amazon Basin
snow-capped manakin
snow-capped manakin
Taxonomy articles created by Polbot